Pechenga Bay (also Petsamo Fjord and Pechenga Fjord) is a fjord-like bay of the Barents Sea on the Kola Peninsula in the Murmansk Oblast, Russia, about 25 km east from the border with Norway. The area was part of Finland from 1920 until 1944. It has rocky shores and stretches inland for 17 km. The Pechenga River discharges into the bay. The settlements of Pechenga and Liinakhamari are located on the shores of the bay.

See also
List of fjords of Russia

Bays of the Barents Sea
Bays of Murmansk Oblast